Cameraria aesculisella is a moth of the family Gracillariidae. It is known from the United States (Kentucky and Pennsylvania).

The wingspan is 8–9 mm.

The larvae feed on Aesculus species, including Aesculus flava, Aesculus glabra, Aesculus octandra and Aesculus pavia. They mine the leaves of their host plant. The mine has the form of a flat, brownish blotch mine on the upperside of the leaf. It is a broad linear tract sometimes containing as many as five or six larvae. The winter is passed in the larval state, the period of hibernation lasting from August until April of the following year.

References

External links
mothphotographersgroup
Cameraria at microleps.org

Cameraria (moth)

Moths of North America
Lepidoptera of the United States
Leaf miners
Moths described in 1871
Taxa named by Vactor Tousey Chambers